The Beasts of Suburban is an extended play (EP) by Australian alternative rock band, TISM. It was produced by Tony Cohen and released in July 1992 via Shock Records. Its title is a pun on the name of fellow Australian band, Beasts of Bourbon (also produced by Cohen). At the ARIA Music Awards of 1993, the album was nominated for Best Independent Release while Cohen was nominated for Producer of the Year for his work on the Cruel Sea's album This Is Not the Way Home and TISM's track, "Get Thee to a Nunnery".

Reception 

Tyler Jenke of Beat reviewed The Beasts of Suburban in his overview of TISM's career in June 2022, stating that the band had "returned to their pub-rock roots" with the seven-track EP. He noticed that they were "far more comfortable with the music they were making."

Australian feminist groups criticised TISM's sexism in their use of Sophie Lee in "Get Thee to a Nunnery". The song allegedly protests the use of sex to sell a product via Lee's appointment as the host of the TV series Sex in 1992, contrasted with her presenting the Nine Network's cartoon show, Looney Tunes in 1990. Karen Fletcher of Green Left Weekly described the latter appointment, "middle-aged men... rush home from work in time to watch Sophie throw to Bugs Bunny cartoons." Lee described TISM's song as "a boring song by a boring bunch of bourgeois boys."

In 2015 ToneDeafs Corey Tonkin listed "Morningtown Ride" as one of the 10 Greatest Songs About Melbourne.

Track listings

On the cassette version, the same program is repeated on both sides of the tape.

 Note: "Morningtown Ride" has a length of 3:48 followed by a short interview and 5:00 of silence.

Reissues

Expanded version.

Release history

References 

TISM albums
1992 EPs
Albums produced by Tony Cohen